David Savard (born October 22, 1990) is a Canadian professional ice hockey defenceman for the Montreal Canadiens of the National Hockey League (NHL). He was drafted by the Columbus Blue Jackets in the fourth round, 94th overall, of the 2009 NHL Entry Draft. Savard won the Stanley Cup with the Tampa Bay Lightning in 2021.

Playing career

Amateur
Savard was born in Saint-Hyacinthe, Quebec. As a youth, he played in the 2003 Quebec International Pee-Wee Hockey Tournament with a minor ice hockey team from Collège Antoine-Girouard, and in the 2004 event with the Richelieu Éclaireurs.

Savard was drafted by the Columbus Blue Jackets in the fourth round, 94th overall, of the 2009 NHL Entry Draft after his second season in the Quebec Major Junior Hockey League (QMJHL) where he was known as a reliable defenceman with strong defensive skills.

The following season, at the urging of the Blue Jackets, Savard started to support the offence more, aiming to become a more complete player. Consequently, he was awarded many trophies at the end of his third junior season, such as the Émile Bouchard Trophy rewarding the best QMJHL defensive defenceman, and the Kevin Lowe Trophy awarded to the best QMJHL defenceman, while finishing first in league scoring among defencemen, establishing a league record for assists as a defenceman.

In the same year, Savard was selected to participate in the Subway Super Series, wearing a Quebec jersey in the tournament. He was named the Canadian Hockey League (CHL) best defenceman, recognizing his remarkable season with the Moncton Wildcats of the QMJHL in 2009–10.

Professional

Columbus Blue Jackets

The next year, still being eligible to play for a junior team, the Columbus Blue Jackets assigned Savard to play with the Springfield Falcons, the team's American Hockey League (AHL) affiliate. After an excellent pro training camp, the Blue Jackets decided Savard would progress faster at the AHL level, following his high marks in junior hockey the former year.

Savard then donned Springfield Falcons colours in the American Hockey League during the 2010–11 season, where he finished as the team's top-scoring defenceman, and second among the league's rookie defencemen.

Savard scored his first career NHL goal on February 7, 2012, against Minnesota Wild goalie Niklas Bäckström. After playing 31 games during the 2011–12 season at the age of 21, he was slowed by an injury suffered in December 2012, shortly before the 2012–13 NHL lock-out's resolution. At the Blue Jackets' camp, he was not able to do justice at the beginning of a season that was going to be shortened, but still managed to be in the lineup for four of the team's 48 games. He spent the majority of the 2012–13 season with Springfield.

On July 15, 2013, as a restricted free agent, Savard was re-signed to a one-year, two-way contract with the Blue Jackets.

Savard played his first full NHL season with the Blue Jackets during the 2013–14 season, registering 15 points in 70 games. On July 5, 2014, Savard signed a two-year contract with the Blue Jackets.

On September 15, 2015, Savard signed a five-year, $21.25 million contract extension with the Blue Jackets. In the 2016–17 season, Savard led the entire NHL in plus–minus at +33.

Tampa Bay Lightning
Entering the final year of his contract in the pandemic delayed 2020–21 season, Savard, in his tenth season with the Blue Jackets, collected 1 goal and 6 points through 40 regular-season games. Approaching the NHL trade deadline, Savard was involved in a three-way trade, being initially dealt to the Detroit Red Wings with 50% of his salary retained in exchange for Brian Lashoff, before he was flipped to the Tampa Bay Lightning with his salary further retained by the Red Wings in exchange for a 2021 fourth-round pick. The Lightning sent the Blue Jackets a 2021 first-round pick and a 2022 third-round pick in exchange for Lashoff to complete the transaction on April 10, 2021. He and the Lightning would then go on to win the Stanley Cup, with Savard registering 5 points in 20 playoff games, including an assist on Ross Colton's Cup-clinching goal in game 5.

Montreal Canadiens
After winning the Stanley Cup with the Lightning, Savard would leave in free agency to sign with the Montreal Canadiens on a four-year, $14 million deal on July 28, 2021. Brought into the lineup at the same time as longtime team captain Shea Weber was placed on long-term injured reserve, Savard was regarded as part of the attempt to compensate for that loss. He became a focus of criticism from fans in the midst of a historically poor season for the team. On January 29, 2022, it was announced that Savard would miss eight weeks of the season due to an ankle injury.

International play
Savard was a member of Canada's gold medal-winning team at the 2015 World Championships, where they won the title for the first time since 2007 with a perfect 10-0 record.

Career statistics

Regular season and playoffs

International

Awards and honours

References

External links
 

1990 births
Living people
Canadian ice hockey defencemen
Columbus Blue Jackets draft picks
Columbus Blue Jackets players
Montreal Canadiens players
Ice hockey people from Quebec
Sportspeople from Saint-Hyacinthe
Springfield Falcons players
Tampa Bay Lightning players
Stanley Cup champions